Lapford railway station is a rural station on the Tarka Line, serving the village of Lapford in Devon.

History

This was provided with a stone building containing the offices and a house for the station master,  

A passing loop was opened on 1 October 1873 and a wooden signal box with 13 levers built opposite the west end of the platform by the points to the loop. There was no room here for a platform to serve the new second track so it had to be built on the east side of the road bridge. This platform was unusually built in between the two lines but the back of the platform was fenced off so passengers could only board or leave westbound trains (those towards Barnstaple). The new platform was provided with a waiting shelter which incorporated a small booking office where tickets were sold for about eight minutes before trains were due to call.

A slaughterhouse for sheep and pigs used to be situated in the northern arch of the road bridge (some meat hooks can be seen in the wall}. In 1927 a factory was built next to the goods yard for Ambrosia and production of milk products such as tinned cream started in April 1928. The factory closed in 1970.

The signal box closed on 21 June 1870. Public goods traffic had ceased from 4 December 1967 however the yard remained open to receive fertiliser traffic until 1991. The loop line remained available for use until December 2010.

Description 
The station is situated south west of Lapford, with the single platform the west of the A377 road bridge. The former station house is now in private use but a small waiting shelter is situated in the platform.

Services
All services at Lapford are operated by Great Western Railway.

Community railway
The railway between Exeter and Barnstaple is designated as a community railway and is supported by marketing provided by the Devon and Cornwall Rail Partnership. The line is promoted as the Tarka Line.

References

Railway stations in Devon
Railway stations in Great Britain opened in 1855
Former London and South Western Railway stations
Railway stations served by Great Western Railway
Railway request stops in Great Britain
DfT Category F2 stations